
Gmina Małkinia Górna is a rural gmina (administrative district) in Ostrów Mazowiecka County, Masovian Voivodeship, in east-central Poland.

Villages
Gmina Małkinia Górna contains the villages and settlements of Błędnica, Boreczek, Borowe, Daniłówka Druga, Daniłówka Pierwsza, Daniłowo, Daniłowo-Parcele, Glina, Grądy, Kańkowo, Kiełczew, Klukowo, Małkinia Dolna, Małkinia Górna, Niegowiec, Orło, Podgórze-Gazdy, Poniatowo, Prostyń, Przewóz, Rostki Wielkie, Rostki-Piotrowice, Sumiężne, Treblinka, Żachy-Pawły, Zawisty Nadbużne and Zawisty Podleśne.

Neighbouring gminas
Gmina Małkinia Górna is bordered by the gminas of Brańszczyk, Brok, Ceranów, Kosów Lacki, Ostrów Mazowiecka, Sadowne and Zaręby Kościelne.

References

Polish official population figures 2006

Malkinia Gorna
Ostrów Mazowiecka County